Josef Arndgen (24 February 1894 – 20 September 1966) was a German politician of the Christian Democratic Union (CDU) and former member of the German Bundestag.

Life 
In 1931 Arndgen joined the Centre Party, of which he was a member until its dissolution in 1933. After the Second World War he participated in the founding of the CDU in Frankfurt am Main. From 1946 to 1949 Arndgen was a member of the state parliament in Hesse.

Since the first federal elections in 1949, Arndgen was a member of the German Bundestag as a directly elected member of the Limburg constituency until 1965. He was vice-chairman of the Bundestag committees for social policy (1949-1957) and for questions of war victims and prisoners of war (1949-1953). From 1957 to 13 November 1958 he was Chairman of the Bundestag Committee on Labour. From 28 October 1958 to 1965, Arndgen was Deputy Chairman of the CDU/CSU parliamentary group in the Bundestag.

From 7 January 1947 to 9 November 1949 Arndgen was Minister of Labour and Welfare in Hesse.

Literature

References

1894 births
1966 deaths
Members of the Bundestag for Hesse
Members of the Bundestag 1961–1965
Members of the Bundestag 1957–1961
Members of the Bundestag 1953–1957
Members of the Bundestag 1949–1953
Members of the Bundestag for the Christian Democratic Union of Germany
Members of the Landtag of Hesse